Distribution may refer to:

Mathematics 
Distribution (mathematics), generalized functions used to formulate solutions of partial differential equations
Probability distribution, the probability of a particular value or value range of a variable
Cumulative distribution function, in which the probability of being no greater than a particular value is a function of that value
Frequency distribution, a list of the values recorded in a sample
Inner distribution, and outer distribution, in coding theory
Distribution (differential geometry), a subset of the tangent bundle of a manifold
Distributed parameter system, systems that have an infinite-dimensional state-space
Distribution of terms, a situation in which all members of a category are accounted for
Distributivity,  a property of binary operations that generalises the distributive law from elementary algebra
Distribution (number theory)
Distribution problems, a common type of problems in combinatorics where the goal is to enumerate the number of possible distributions of  objects to  recipients, subject to various conditions; see Twelvefold way

Computing and telecommunications
Distribution (concurrency), the projection operator in a history monoid, a representation of the histories of concurrent computer processes
Data distribution or dissemination, to distribute information without direct feedback
Digital distribution, publishing media digitally
Distributed computing, the coordinated use of physically distributed computers (distributed systems) for tasks or storage
Electronic brakeforce distribution, an automotive technology that varies brake force based on prevailing conditions
Key distribution center, part of a cryptosystem intended to reduce the risks inherent in exchanging keys
Software distribution,  bundles of a specific software already compiled and configured
A specific packaging of an operating system containing a kernel, toolchain, utilities and other software
Linux distribution, one of several distributions built on the Linux kernel

Natural sciences
Distribution (pharmacology), the movement of a drug from one location to another within the body
Species distribution, the manner in which a species is spatially arranged
Cosmopolitan distribution, in which a species appears in appropriate environments around the world
Spectral power distribution of light sources

Economics
Distribution (economics), distribution of income or output among individuals or factors of production (or to help others)
Distribution in kind, concerning the transfer of non-cash assets by a company to a shareholder, see Companies Act 2006
Distribution (marketing), or place, one of the four elements of marketing mix
Distribution resource planning, method used in business administration for planning orders within a supply chain
Distributionism, an economic ideology
Distribution of wealth, among members in a society
Division of property, or equitable distribution, of property between spouses during divorce
Food distribution, methods of transporting food
Drug distribution, methods by which medication goes from manufacturer to consumer

Other sciences
Electric power distribution, the final stage in the delivery of electricity
Distributed generation, the use of technologies to provide electric power at the source of consumption
Distributed production or distributed manufacturing, the fabrication of products by consumers such as with 3D printing
Distribution of elements in the distributed-element model of electric circuits
Trip distribution, part of the four-step transportation forecasting model
The distribution of a linguistic element is the set of environments in which it occurs, which may be in complementary distribution, contrastive distribution, or free variation with another such element, and which is the basis of distributional semantics

Other uses
Film distribution, the process of making a movie available for the audiences to watch
Film distributor, an agent between a film producer and an exhibitor
Purse distribution, in a horse race, the distribution of winnings among the highest finishers
Record distribution, process of shipping and promoting record labels
Font distribution, the units in which metal type is sold, containing relative proportions of letters appropriate for a given language
Distribution (bridge), a term in the bridge card game

See also
Apportionment, means distribution or allotment in proper shares
Distributism, a political philosophy 
Distributor (disambiguation)
Range (disambiguation)